Swiss sword (Schweizerschwert) can refer to:
the Swiss degen
the  broadsword used by the Swiss, see walloon sword
the Swiss sabre

See also
Swiss arms and armour